Jihlava District  is a district in the Vysočina Region of the Czech Republic. Its capital is the city of Jihlava.

Administrative division
Jihlava District is divided into two administrative districts of municipalities with extended competence: Jihlava and Telč.

List of municipalities
Cities and towns are marked in bold and market towns in italics:

Arnolec -
Batelov -
Bílý Kámen -
Bítovčice -
Bohuslavice -
Borovná -
Boršov -
Brtnice -
Brtnička -
Brzkov -
Cejle -
Cerekvička-Rosice -
Černíč -
Čížov -
Dlouhá Brtnice -
Dobronín -
Dobroutov -
Dolní Cerekev -
Dolní Vilímeč -
Doupě -
Dudín -
Dušejov -
Dvorce -
Dyjice -
Hladov -
Hodice -
Hojkov -
Horní Dubenky -
Horní Myslová -
Hostětice -
Hrutov -
Hubenov -
Hybrálec -
Jamné -
Jersín -
Jezdovice -
Ježená -
Jihlava -
Jihlávka -
Jindřichovice -
Kalhov -
Kaliště -
Kamenice -
Kamenná -
Klatovec -
Kněžice -
Knínice -
Kostelec -
Kostelní Myslová -
Kozlov -
Krahulčí -
Krasonice -
Lhotka -
Luka nad Jihlavou -
Malý Beranov -
Markvartice -
Měšín -
Milíčov -
Mirošov -
Mrákotín -
Mysletice -
Mysliboř -
Nadějov -
Nevcehle -
Nová Říše -
Olšany -
Olší -
Opatov -
Ořechov -
Otín -
Panenská Rozsíčka -
Panské Dubenky -
Pavlov -
Plandry -
Polná -
Puklice -
Radkov -
Rančířov -
Rantířov -
Řásná -
Řídelov -
Rohozná -
Rozseč -
Růžená -
Rybné -
Sedlatice -
Sedlejov -
Šimanov -
Smrčná -
Stáj -
Stará Říše -
Stonařov -
Strachoňovice -
Střítež -
Suchá -
Švábov -
Svojkovice -
Telč -
Třešť -
Třeštice -
Urbanov -
Ústí -
Vanov -
Vanůvek -
Vápovice -
Velký Beranov -
Větrný Jeníkov -
Věžnice -
Věžnička -
Vílanec -
Volevčice -
Vyskytná nad Jihlavou -
Vysoké Studnice -
Vystrčenovice -
Záborná -
Zadní Vydří -
Žatec -
Zbilidy -
Zbinohy -
Zdeňkov -
Ždírec -
Zhoř -
Zvolenovice

Geography

The climate of the district is harsh and cold for most of the year. The territory extends into five geomorphological mesoregions: Křižanov Highlands (most of the territory), Upper Sázava Hills (north), Křemešník Highlands (northwest), Javořice Highlands (southwest) and Jevišovice Uplands (small parts in the southeast).

The most important river is the Jihlava, which flows across the district from west to east. Southern part of the district is drained by the Moravian Thaya. The largest bodies of water are the reservoirs Nová Říše and Hubenov, there are also many ponds.

There are no protected landscape areas, only small-scale protected areas.

Demographics

Most populated municipalities

Economy
The largest employers with its headquarters in Jihlava District and at least 1,000 employers are:

Transport
The D1 motorway from Prague to Brno passes through the northern part of the district.

Sights

The historic centre of Telč was designated a UNESCO World Heritage Site in 1992 because of its outstanding nature and architectural value.

The most important monuments in the district, protected as national cultural monuments, are:
Telč Castle
Church of Saint James the Great in Jihlava
Church of the Assumption of the Virgin Mary in Polná

The best-preserved settlements, protected as monument reservations and monument zones, are:
Jihlava (monument reservation)
Telč (monument reservation)
Brtnice
Polná
Telč-Staré Město
Třešť
Praskolesy

The most visited tourist destinations are the Jihlava Zoo, Jihlava water park, Roštejn Castle in Doupě, and Jihlava family park Robinson.

References

External links

Jihlava District profile on the Czech Statistical Office's website

 
Districts of the Czech Republic